An empyema is a collection or gathering of pus within a naturally existing anatomical cavity. For example, pleural empyema is empyema of the pleural cavity. It must be differentiated from an abscess, which is a collection of pus in a newly formed cavity. The term is from Greek ἐμπύημα, "abscess".

Classification 
Empyema occurs in:
 the pleural cavity (pleural empyema also known as pyothorax)
 the thoracic cavity 
 the uterus (pyometra) 
 the appendix (appendicitis)
 the meninges (subdural empyema)
 the joints (septic arthritis)
 the gallbladder

External links 

Immune system
Medical terminology